Wioletta Potępa (born 13 December 1980 in Ciechanów) is a former discus thrower from Poland. Her personal best throw is 66.01 metres, achieved in May 2006 in Halle. She retired in August 2012.

Competition record

References

1980 births
Living people
Polish female discus throwers
Athletes (track and field) at the 2004 Summer Olympics
Athletes (track and field) at the 2008 Summer Olympics
Olympic athletes of Poland
People from Ciechanów
Sportspeople from Masovian Voivodeship
Universiade medalists in athletics (track and field)
Universiade gold medalists for Poland
Competitors at the 2003 Summer Universiade
Medalists at the 2005 Summer Universiade
21st-century Polish women